Mamadou Tew (27 November 1959 – 31 August 2019) was a Senegalese footballer who played at both professional and international levels as a right back.

Club career
Tew began his career in his native Senegal with Casa Sport, before moving to Belgian club Club Brugge in 1984. Tew spent six seasons at Brugge, making nearly 150 appearances in all competitions. Tew later played for Charleroi before ending his career at his first club Casa Sport.

International career
Tew made one appearance for Senegal in July 1984.

Tew made 3 appearances at the 1986 African Cup of Nations finals in Egypt and at the 1990 African Cup of Nations finals in Algeria. He also appeared twice in the 1992 African Cup of Nations finals as Senegal hosted.

Death
Tew died in Dakar, Senegal on 31 August 2019.

References

1959 births
2019 deaths
Senegalese footballers
Senegalese expatriate footballers
Senegal international footballers
Club Brugge KV players
R. Charleroi S.C. players
Belgian Pro League players
1986 African Cup of Nations players
1990 African Cup of Nations players
1992 African Cup of Nations players
Association football fullbacks
Senegalese expatriate sportspeople in Belgium
Expatriate footballers in Belgium